Superman/Doomsday: Hunter/Prey is a 1994 American comic book series published by DC Comics. The three-issue miniseries follows The Death of Superman.

Concept
Superman/Doomsday: Hunter/Prey is a three-issue miniseries which explores the origin of the character Doomsday, and the rematch between him and Superman after their first battle in The Death of Superman. The story includes appearances by Bertron, Waverider, Lois Lane, Cyborg Superman, Darkseid and Linear Men. The story arc was written and penciled by Dan Jurgens, inked by Brett Breeding, and colored by Gregory Wright.

Collected edition
The three-issue miniseries was collected as softcover titled Superman: Doomsday released in the year of 2016. The edition also collects DOOMSDAY ANNUAL #1, and SUPERMAN: THE DOOMSDAY WARS #1-3

Reception
Steve Faragher reviewed Superman/Doomsday – Hunter/Prey for Arcane magazine, rating it a 4 out of 10 overall. Faragher comments that "writer Jurgens and artist Breeding do their best to inject some angst into the well-chronicled cape-wearer's philosophy, but they're up against a wall of steel and their well-intentioned attempts fail to add anything new to the myth of Superman".

References

1994 comics debuts
DC Comics limited series
Lists of comic book titles
Lists of comics by character
Lists of comics by DC Comics